The Dandenong Rangers were an Australian professional women's basketball team competing in the Women's National Basketball League (WNBL). The club is based in Dandenong, Melbourne, Victoria. The team was founded as the Dandenong Rangers, however before the 2019–20 WNBL season began the team was rebranded to the Southside Flyers, adopting a new logo, colour scheme and nickname.

History 
Historically, they have been one of the more successful franchises in league history, regularly making the playoffs, but have struggled over recent years to make the grand final, falling short in earlier stages. The Rangers appeared in the Grand Final six times, winning the championship in 2004 and 2005 both against Sydney, and then again in 2012 against Bulleen. The Rangers fell short in the Grand Final in 1992, 2006 and 2017 against Perth, Canberra & Sydney respectively. They are strong rivals with the cross-town Melbourne Boomers.

On 31 July 2019, it was announced the Rangers would undergo an entire rebrand to become Southside Flyers for the 2019–20 WNBL season. The Flyers will replace the classic bottle green and gold identity of the Rangers, with a colour scheme of aqua, navy blue, cyan blue and white expected to feature.

Season-by-season records

Source: Dandenong Rangers

Players

Final roster

Former players
Stephanie Blicavs
Jessica Bibby
Liz Cambage
Aimie Clydesdale
Alison Downie
Lucille Hamilton 
Jacinta Kennedy 
Kathleen MacLeod 
Emily McInerny 
Leilani Mitchell 
Jenna O'Hea 
Laia Palau
Kayla Pedersen 
Cappie Pondexter 
Caitlin Ryan 
Penny Taylor 
Samantha Thornton 
Carly Wilson

See also

 Southside Flyers
 Melbourne Boomers
 Women's National Basketball League
 NBL1

References

External links
 Official Dandenong Basketball Association website
 Official WNBL website
 Official WNBL club website
 Dandenong Rangers official website

 
Basketball teams in Melbourne
Women's National Basketball League teams
Basketball teams established in 1992
1992 establishments in Australia
Sport in the City of Greater Dandenong